Handover may refer to:
Handover of knowledge between humans, often as part of a formal transfer of responsibility. Sometimes known as a handoff in North America.
Handover in telecommunications, the transfer of a call or session from one channel to another
HanDover (album), a 2011 album by the band Skinny Puppy
Handover (political), the political transfer of power
Handover (rugby), the change of control of the ball in the game of rugby league
Hand-Over, in animation, the process of adding finger and hand motion capture data to a full-body motion capture data
 Transfer of sovereignty over Hong Kong, a 1997 event often called the Handover

See also
Handoff (disambiguation)
Change-of-shift report